Moss Hall, Audlem, is a manor house  north-west of Audlem, Cheshire, England.  It is recorded in the National Heritage List for England as a designated Grade I-listed building.  The Hall overlooks the Shropshire Union Canal.

Moss Hall was built in 1616 for Hugh Massey, then owned by Edward Legh of Baguley Hall.  It is timber-framed with rendered infill, and close studded with a middle rail to both floors.  It is in two storeys with attics, and has a plain tile roof.  The entrance front has five bays with four gables.  The house is nearly symmetrical, is E-shaped, and is set on an ashlar plinth.  In its centre is a two-storey gabled porch wing, which is a later addition.  The first floor is jettied and supported on carved brackets.  It has been described as "a surprisingly complete example of a gentleman's house of the early 17th century".

See also

Grade I listed buildings in Cheshire East
Listed buildings in Audlem

References

Grade I listed buildings in Cheshire
Houses completed in 1616
Country houses in Cheshire
Grade I listed houses
Timber framed buildings in Cheshire
1616 establishments in England